Bilobata is a genus of moth in the family Gelechiidae.

Species
 Bilobata argosticha (Janse, 1954)
 Bilobata subsecivella (Zeller, 1852)
 Bilobata torninotella (Janse, 1954)

References

Gelechiinae